Ikhlaq Butt (born 21 September 1992) is a Pakistani cricketer. He played in seventeen first-class and eleven List A matches between 2012 and 2016. He made his Twenty20 debut on 7 February 2014, for Lahore Eagles in the 2013–14 National T20 Cup.

References

External links
 

1992 births
Living people
Pakistani cricketers
Lahore Eagles cricketers
Water and Power Development Authority cricketers
Place of birth missing (living people)